Dresvyanka is a rural locality (a selo) in Stolbovsky Selsoviet, Kamensky District, Altai Krai, Russia. The population was 411 as of 2013. There are 14 streets.

Geography 
Dresvyanka is located 17 km north of Kamen-na-Obi (the district's administrative centre) by road. Novouvalsky is the nearest rural locality.

References 

Rural localities in Kamensky District, Altai Krai